Brian Asamoah II (born March 29, 2000) is an American football inside linebacker for the Minnesota Vikings of the National Football League (NFL). He played college football at Oklahoma.

High school career
Asamoah was born to a Ghanaian family and raised in Columbus, Ohio. He attended St. Francis De Sales High School in Columbus. He played linebacker and running back in high school. He committed to the University of Oklahoma to play college football.

College career
After redshirting his first year at Oklahoma in 2018, Asamoah had 23 tackles and two sacks in 2019. In 2020, he played in eleven games with nine starts and led the team with 66 tackles, two sacks and one interception. As a junior in 2021, Asamoah started 10 of 12 games, recording 90 tackles and two forced fumbles. He decided to sit out the 2021 Alamo Bowl in preparation for the 2022 NFL Draft.

Professional career

Asamoah was selected by the Minnesota Vikings with 66th overall pick in the third round of the 2022 NFL Draft.

References

External links
 Minnesota Vikings bio
Oklahoma Sooners bio

2000 births
Living people
American sportspeople of Ghanaian descent
Players of American football from Columbus, Ohio
American football linebackers
Oklahoma Sooners football players
Minnesota Vikings players